Nicolas Grenier may refer to:
 Nicolas Grenier (poet)
 Nicolas Grenier (artist)